The Chola dynasty was a Tamil thalassocratic empire of southern India and one of the longest-ruling dynasties in world history. The earliest datable references to the Chola are from inscriptions dated to the 3rd century BCE during the reign of Ashoka of the Maurya Empire. As one of the Three Crowned Kings of Tamilakam, along with the Chera and Pandya, the dynasty continued to govern over varying territories until the 13th century CE. The Chola Empire was at its peak and achieved imperialism under the Medieval Cholas in the mid-9th century CE.

The heartland of the Cholas was the fertile valley of the Kaveri River. They ruled a significantly larger area at the height of their power from the later half of the 9th century till the beginning of the 13th century. They unified peninsular India south of the Tungabhadra River, and held the territory as one state for three centuries between 907 and 1215 CE. Under Rajaraja I and his successors Rajendra I, Rajadhiraja I, Rajendra II, Virarajendra, and Kulothunga Chola I, the dynasty became a military, economic and cultural powerhouse in South Asia and Southeast Asia.  The power and the prestige the Cholas had among political powers in South, Southeast, and East Asia at its peak is evident through their expeditions to the Ganges, naval raids on cities of the Srivijaya empire based on the island of Sumatra, and their repeated embassies to China. The Chola fleet represented the zenith of ancient Indian maritime capacity.

During the period of 1010–1153 CE, the Chola territories stretched from the Maldives in the south to the banks of the Godavari River in Andhra Pradesh as the northern limit. Rajaraja Chola conquered peninsular South India, annexed part of the Rajarata kingdom in present-day Sri Lanka, and occupied Maldives islands. His son Rajendra Chola further expanded the Cholar territory by sending a victorious expedition to North India that touched the river Ganges and defeating the Pala ruler of Pataliputra, Mahipala. By 1019, he also completely conquered the Rajarata kingdom of Sri Lanka and annexed it to the Chola empire. In 1017 and 1025, Rajendra Chola launched raids on the cities of the Srivijaya empire. However, this invasion failed to install direct administration over Srivijaya, as the invasion was short and only meant to plunder the wealth of Srivijaya. However, the Chola influence on Srivijava would last until 1070, when the Cholas began to lose almost all of their overseas territories. The later Cholas (1070–1279 CE) would still rule portions of Southern India. The Chola dynasty went into decline at the beginning of the 13th century with the rise of the Pandyan dynasty, which ultimately caused their downfall.

The Cholas succeeded in building the greatest thalassocratic empire in the history of India, thereby leaving a lasting legacy. They established a centralized form of government and a disciplined bureaucracy. Moreover, their patronage of Tamil literature and their zeal for building temples has resulted in some of the greatest works of Tamil literature and architecture. The Chola kings were avid builders and envisioned the temples in their kingdoms not only as places of worship but also as centers of economic activity. A UNESCO world heritage site, the Brihadisvara temple at Thanjavur, commissioned by the Rajaraja Chola in 1010 CE, is a prime example for Cholar architecture. They were also well known for their patronage to art. The development of the specific sculpturing technique used in the 'Chola bronzes', exquisite bronze sculptures of Hindu deities built in a lost wax process was pioneered in their time. The Chola tradition of art spread and influenced the architecture and art of Southeast Asia.

Origins
There is very little written evidence for the Cholas prior to the 7th century CE. The main sources of information about the early Cholas are ancient Tamil literature of the Sangam Period, oral traditions, religious texts, temple and copperplate inscriptions. Later medieval Cholas also claimed a long and ancient lineage. The Cholas are mentioned in Ashokan Edicts (inscribed 273 BCE–232 BCE) as one of the Mauryan Empire's neighbors to the South (Ashoka Major Rock Edict No.13), who, thought not subject to Ashoka, were on friendly terms with him. There are also brief references to the Chola country and its towns, ports and commerce in the Periplus of the Erythraean Sea (Periplus Maris Erythraei), and in the slightly later work of the geographer Ptolemy. Mahavamsa, a Buddhist text written down during the 5th century CE, recounts a number of conflicts between the inhabitants of Sri Lanka and Cholas in the 1st century BCE.

A commonly held view is that Chola is, like Chera and Pandya, the name of the ruling family or clan of immemorial antiquity. The annotator Parimelazhagar said: "The charity of people with ancient lineage (such as the Cholas, the Pandyas and the Cheras) are forever generous in spite of their reduced means". Other names in common use for the Cholas are Choda, Killi (கிள்ளி), Valavan (வளவன்), Sembiyan (செம்பியன்) and Cenni. Killi perhaps comes from the Tamil kil (கிள்) meaning dig or cleave and conveys the idea of a digger or a worker of the land. This word often forms an integral part of early Chola names like Nedunkilli, Nalankilli and so on, but almost drops out of use in later times. Valavan is most probably connected with "valam" (வளம்) – fertility and means owner or ruler of a fertile country. Sembiyan is generally taken to mean a descendant of Shibi – a legendary hero whose self-sacrifice in saving a dove from the pursuit of a falcon figures among the early Chola legends and forms the subject matter of the Sibi Jataka among the Jataka stories of Buddhism. In Tamil lexicon Chola means Soazhi or Saei denoting a newly formed kingdom, in the lines of Pandya or the old country. Cenni in Tamil means Head.

History
The history of the Cholas falls into four periods: the Early Cholas of the Sangam literature, the interregnum between the fall of the Sangam Cholas and the rise of the Imperial medieval Cholas under Vijayalaya (c. 848), the dynasty of Vijayalaya, and finally the Later Chola dynasty of Kulothunga Chola I from the third quarter of the 11th century.

Early Cholas

The earliest Chola kings for whom there is tangible evidence are mentioned in the Sangam literature. Scholars generally agree that this literature belongs to the late centuries before the common era and the early centuries of the common era. The internal chronology of this literature is still far from settled, and at present a connected account of the history of the period cannot be derived. It records the names of the kings and the princes, and of the poets who extolled them.

The Sangam literature also records legends about mythical Chola kings. These myths speak of the Chola king Kantaman, a supposed contemporary of the sage Agastya, whose devotion brought the river Kaveri into existence. Two names are prominent among those Chola kings known to have existed who feature in Sangam literature: Karikala and Kocengannan. There are no sure means of settling the order of succession, of fixing their relations with one another and with many other princelings of around the same period. Urayur (now a part of Thiruchirapalli) was their oldest capital. Kaveripattinam also served as an early Chola capital. The Mahavamsa mentions that an ethnic Tamil adventurer, a Chola prince known as Ellalan, invaded the Rajarata kingdom of Sri Lanka and conquered it in 235 BCE with the help of a Mysore army.

Interregnum

There is not much information about the transition period of around three centuries from the end of the Sangam age (c. 300) to that in which the Pandyas and Pallavas dominated the Tamil country. An obscure dynasty, the Kalabhras invaded Tamil country, displaced the existing kingdoms and ruled during that time. They were displaced by the Pallava dynasty and the Pandyan dynasty in the 6th century. Little is known of the fate of the Cholas during the succeeding three centuries until the accession of Vijayalaya in the second quarter of the 9th century. As per inscriptions found in and around Thanjavur, the kingdom was ruled by Mutharaiyars / Muthurajas for three centuries. Their reign was ended by Vijayalaya chola who captured Thanjavur from Ilango Mutharaiyar between 848 and 851 CE.

Epigraphy and literature provide few glimpses of the transformations that came over this line of kings during this long interval. It is certain that when the power of the Cholas fell to its lowest ebb and that of the Pandyas and Pallavas rose to the north and south of them, this dynasty was compelled to seek refuge and patronage under their more successful rivals. The Cholas continued to rule over a diminished territory in the neighbourhood of Uraiyur, but only in a minor capacity. In spite of their reduced powers, the Pandyas and Pallavas accepted Chola princesses in marriage, possibly out of regard for their reputation. Numerous Pallava inscriptions of this period mention their having fought rulers of the Chola country. Despite this loss in influence and power, it is unlikely that the Cholas lost total grip of the territory around Uraiyur, their old capital, as Vijayalaya, when he rose to prominence hailed from that area.

Around the 7th century, a Chola kingdom flourished in present-day Andhra Pradesh. These Telugu Cholas traced their descent to the early Sangam Cholas. However, it is not known if they had any relation to the early Cholas. It is possible that a branch of the Tamil Cholas migrated north during the time of the Pallavas to establish a kingdom of their own, away from the dominating influences of the Pandyas and Pallavas. The Chinese pilgrim Xuanzang, who spent several months in Kanchipuram during 639–640 writes about the "kingdom of Culi-ya", in an apparent reference to these Telugu Cholas.

Imperial Cholas 

Vijayalaya was the founder of the Imperial Chola dynasty which was the beginning of one of the most splendid empires in Indian history. Vijayalaya, possibly a feudatory of the Pallava dynasty, took an opportunity arising out of a conflict between the Pandya dynasty and Pallava dynasty in c. 850, captured Thanjavur from Muttarayar, and established the imperial line of the medieval Chola Dynasty. Thanjavur became the capital of the Imperial Chola Dynasty.

The Chola dynasty was at the peak of its influence and power during the medieval period. Through their leadership and vision, Chola kings expanded their territory and influence. The second Chola King, Aditya I, caused the demise of the Pallava dynasty and defeated the Pandyan dynasty of Madurai in 885, occupied large parts of the Kannada country, and had marital ties with the Western Ganga dynasty. In 925, his son Parantaka I conquered Sri Lanka (known as Ilangai). Parantaka I also defeated the Rashtrakuta dynasty under Krishna II in the battle of Vallala.

Rajaraja Chola I and Rajendra Chola I were the greatest rulers of the Chola dynasty, extending it beyond the traditional limits of a Tamil kingdom. At its peak, the Chola Empire stretched from the northern parts of Sri Lanka in the south to the Godavari-Krishna river basin in the north, up to the Konkan coast in Bhatkal, the entire Malabar Coast (the Chea country) in addition to Lakshadweep, and Maldives. Rajaraja Chola I was a ruler with inexhaustible energy, and he applied himself to the task of governance with the same zeal that he had shown in waging wars. He integrated his empire into a tight administrative grid under royal control, and at the same time strengthened local self-government. Therefore, he conducted a land survey in 1000 CE to effectively marshall the resources of his empire. He also built the Brihadeeswarar Temple in 1010 CE.

Rajendra Chola I conquered Odisha and his armies continued to march further north and defeated the forces of the Pala dynasty of Bengal and reached the Ganges river in north India. Rajendra Chola I built a new capital called Gangaikonda Cholapuram to celebrate his victories in northern India. Rajendra Chola I successfully invaded the Srivijaya kingdom in Southeast Asia which led to the decline of the empire there. This expedition had such a great impression to the Malay people of the medieval period that his name was mentioned in the corrupted form as Raja Chulan in the medieval Malay chronicle Sejarah Melayu. He also completed the conquest of the Rajarata kingdom of Sri Lanka and took the Sinhala king Mahinda V as a prisoner, in addition to his conquests of Rattapadi (territories of the Rashtrakutas, Chalukya country, Talakkad, and Kolar, where the Kolaramma temple still has his portrait statue) in Kannada country. Rajendra's territories included the area falling on the Ganges-Hooghly-Damodar basin, as well as Rajarata of Sri Lanka and Maldives. The kingdoms along the east coast of India up to the river Ganges acknowledged Chola suzerainty. Three diplomatic missions were sent to China in 1016, 1033, and 1077.

 

The Western Chalukya Empire under Satyashraya and Someshvara I tried to wriggle out of Chola domination from time to time, primarily due to the Chola influence in the Vengi kingdom. The Western Chalukyas mounted several unsuccessful attempts to engage the Chola emperors in war, and except for a brief occupation of Vengi territories between 1118 and 1126, all their other attempts ended in failure with successive Chola emperors routing the armies of the Chalukyas at various places in many wars. Virarajendra Chola defeated Someshvara II of the Western Chalukya Empire and made an alliance with Prince Vikramaditya VI. Cholas always successfully controlled the Chalukyas in the western Deccan by defeating them in war and levying tribute on them. Even under the emperors of the Cholas like Kulothunga I and Vikrama Chola, the wars against the Chalukyas were mainly fought in Chalukya territories in Karnataka or in the Telugu country like Vengi, Kakinada, Anantapur, or Gutti. Then the former feudatories like the Hoysalas, Yadvas, and Kakatiyas steadily increased their power and finally replaced the Chalukyas. With the occupation of Dharwar in North Central Karnataka by the Hoysalas under Vishnuvardhana, where he based himself with his son Narasimha I in-charge at the Hoysala capital Dwarasamudra around 1149, and with the Kalachuris occupying the Chalukyan capital for over 35 years from around 1150–1151, the Chalukya kingdom was already starting to dissolve.

The Cholas under Kulothunga Chola III collaborated to the herald the dissolution of the Chalukyas by aiding Hoysalas under Veera Ballala II, the son-in-law of the Chola monarch, and defeated the Western Chalukyas in a series of wars with Someshvara IV between 1185 and 1190. The last Chalukya king's territories did not even include the erstwhile Chalukyan capitals Badami, Manyakheta or Kalyani. That was the final dissolution of Chalukyan power though the Chalukyas existed only in name since 1135–1140. But the Cholas remained stable until 1215, were absorbed by the Pandyan empire and ceased to exist by 1279.

On the other hand, from 1150 CE to 1280 CE, Pandya became the staunchest opponents of the Cholas and tried to win independence for their traditional territories. Thus, this period saw constant warfare between the Cholas and the Pandyas. Besides, Cholas regularly fought with the Eastern Gangas of Kalinga. Moreover, under Chola's protection, Veng remained largely independent. Cholas also dominated the entire eastern coast with their feudatories, the Telugu Cholas, Velananti Cholas, Renandu Cholas, etc.. These feudatories always aided the Cholas in their successful campaigns against the Chalukyas and levying tribute on the Kannada kingdoms. Furthermore, Cholar fought constantly with the Sinhala kings from the Rohana kingdom of Sri Lanka, who repeatedly attempted to overthrow the Chola occupation of Rajarata and unify the island. But until the later Chola king Kulottunga I, the Cholas had firm control over the area. In one such instance, the Chola king, Rajadhiraja Chola II, was able to defeat the Sinhalese, aided by their traditional ally, a confederation of five Pandya princes, and kept the control of Rajarata under Cholar rule. His successor, the last great Chola monarch Kulottunga Chola III reinforced the hold of the Chola territories by quelling further rebellions and disturbances in the Rajarata area of Sri Lanka and Madurai. He also defeated Hoysala generals fought under Veera Ballala II at Karuvur. Furthermore, he also continued holding on to traditional territories in Tamil country, Eastern Gangavadi, Draksharama, Vengi, and Kalinga. However, after defeating Veera Ballala II, Kulottunga Chola III entered into a marital alliance with him through Ballala's marriage to a Chola princess, which improved the Kulottunga Chola III relationship with Hoysalas.

Overseas conquests

During the reign of Rajaraja Chola I and his successors Rajendra Chola I, Virarajendra Chola and Kulothunga Chola I the Chola armies invaded Sri Lanka, the Maldives and parts of Southeast Asia like Malaysia, Indonesia and Southern Thailand of the Srivijaya Empire in the 11th century. Rajaraja Chola I launched several naval campaigns that resulted in the capture of Sri Lanka, Maldives and the Malabar Coast. In 1025, Rajendra Chola launched naval raids on ports of Srivijaya and against the Burmese kingdom of Pegu. A Chola inscription states that he captured or plundered 14 places, which have been identified with Palembang, Tambralinga and Kedah among others. A second invasion was led by Virarajendra Chola, who conquered Kedah in Malaysia of Srivijaya in the late 11th century. Chola invasion ultimately failed to install direct administration over Srivijaya, since the invasion was short and only meant to plunder the wealth of Srivijaya. However, this invasion gravely weakened the Srivijayan hegemony and enabled the formation of regional kingdoms. Although the invasion was not followed by direct Cholan occupation and the region was unchanged geographically, there were huge consequences in trade. Tamil traders encroached on the Srivijayan realm traditionally controlled by Malay traders and the Tamil guilds' influence increased on the Malay Peninsula and north coast of Sumatra.

Later Cholas (1070–1279)

Marital and political alliances between the Eastern Chalukyas began during the reign of Rajaraja following his invasion of Vengi. Rajaraja Chola's daughter married Chalukya prince Vimaladitya and Rajendra Chola's daughter Ammanga Devi was married to the Eastern Chalukya prince Rajaraja Narendra. Virarajendra Chola's son, Athirajendra Chola, was assassinated in a civil disturbance in 1070, and Kulothunga Chola I, the son of Ammanga Devi and Rajaraja Narendra, ascended the Chola throne. Thus began the Later Chola dynasty.

The Later Chola dynasty was led by capable rulers such as Kulothunga Chola I, his son Vikrama Chola, other successors like Rajaraja Chola II, Rajadhiraja Chola II, and Kulothunga Chola III, who conquered Kalinga, Ilam, and Kataha. However, the rule of the later Cholas between 1218, starting with Rajaraja Chola II, to the last emperor Rajendra Chola III was not as strong as those of the emperors between 850 and 1215. Around 1118, they lost control of Vengi to the Western Chalukya and Gangavadi (southern Mysore districts) to the Hoysala Empire. However, these were only temporary setbacks, because immediately following the accession of king Vikrama Chola, the son and successor of Kulothunga Chola I, the Cholas lost no time in recovering the province of Vengi by defeating Chalukya Someshvara III and also recovering Gangavadi from the Hoysalas. The Chola Empire, though not as strong as between 850 and 1150, was still largely territorially intact under Rajaraja Chola II (1146–1175) a fact attested by the construction and completion of the third grand Chola architectural marvel, the chariot-shaped Airavatesvara Temple at Dharasuram on the outskirts of modern Kumbakonam. Chola administration and territorial integrity until the rule of Kulothunga Chola III was stable and very prosperous up to 1215, but during his rule itself, the decline of the Chola power started following his defeat by Maravarman Sundara Pandiyan II in 1215–16. Subsequently, the Cholas also lost control of the island of Lanka and were driven out by the revival of Sinhala power.

In continuation of the decline, also marked by the resurgence of the Pandyan dynasty as the most powerful rulers in South India, a lack of a controlling central administration in its erstwhile-Pandyan territories prompted a number of claimants to the Pandya throne to cause a civil war in which the Sinhalas and the Cholas were involved by proxy. Details of the Pandyan civil war and the role played by the Cholas and Sinhalas, are present in the Mahavamsa as well as the Pallavarayanpettai Inscriptions.

Decline
The Cholas, under Rajaraja Chola III and later, his successor Rajendra Chola III, were quite weak and therefore, experienced continuous trouble. One feudatory, the Kadava chieftain Kopperunchinga I, even held Rajaraja Chola III as hostage for sometime. At the close of the 12th century, the growing influence of the Hoysalas replaced the declining Chalukyas as the main player in the Kannada country, but they too faced constant trouble from the Seunas and the Kalachuris, who were occupying Chalukya capital because those empires were their new rivals. So naturally, the Hoysalas found it convenient to have friendly relations with the Cholas from the time of Kulothunga Chola III, who had defeated Hoysala Veera Ballala II, who had subsequent marital relations with the Chola monarch. This continued during the time of Rajaraja Chola III the son and successor of Kulothunga Chola III

The Hoysalas played a divisive role in the politics of the Tamil country during this period. They thoroughly exploited the lack of unity among the Tamil kingdoms and alternately supported one Tamil kingdom against the other thereby preventing both the Cholas and Pandyas from rising to their full potential. During the period of Rajaraja III, the Hoysalas sided with the Cholas and defeated the Kadava chieftain Kopperunjinga and the Pandyas and established a presence in the Tamil country. Rajendra Chola III who succeeded Rajaraja III was a much better ruler who took bold steps to revive the Chola fortunes. He led successful expeditions to the north as attested by his epigraphs found as far as Cuddappah. He also defeated two Pandya princes one of whom was Maravarman Sundara Pandya II and briefly made the Pandyas submit to the Chola overlordship. The Hoysalas, under Vira Someswara, were quick to intervene and this time they sided with the Pandyas and repulsed the Cholas in order to counter the latter's revival. The Pandyas in the south had risen to the rank of a great power who ultimately banished the Hoysalas from Malanadu or Kannada country, who were allies of the Cholas from Tamil country and the demise of the Cholas themselves ultimately was caused by the Pandyas in 1279. The Pandyas first steadily gained control of the Tamil country as well as territories in Sri Lanka, southern Chera country, Telugu country under Maravarman Sundara Pandiyan II and his able successor Jatavarman Sundara Pandyan before inflicting several defeats on the joint forces of the Cholas under Rajaraja Chola III, and the Hoysalas under Someshwara, his son Ramanatha The Pandyans gradually became major players in the Tamil country from 1215 and intelligently consolidated their position in Madurai-Rameswaram-Ilam-southern Chera country and Kanyakumari belt, and had been steadily increasing their territories in the Kaveri belt between Dindigul-Tiruchy-Karur-Satyamangalam as well as in the Kaveri Delta i.e., Thanjavur-Mayuram-Chidambaram-Vriddhachalam-Kanchi, finally marching all the way up to Arcot—Tirumalai-Nellore-Visayawadai-Vengi-Kalingam belt by 1250.

The Pandyas steadily routed both the Hoysalas and the Cholas. They also dispossessed the Hoysalas, by defeating them under Jatavarman Sundara Pandiyan at Kannanur Kuppam. At the close of Rajendra's reign, the Pandyan empire was at the height of prosperity and had taken the place of the Chola empire in the eyes of the foreign observers. The last recorded date of Rajendra III is 1279. There is no evidence that Rajendra was followed immediately by another Chola prince. The Hoysalas were routed from Kannanur Kuppam around 1279 by Kulasekhara Pandiyan and in the same war the last Chola emperor Rajendra III was routed and the Chola empire ceased to exist thereafter. Thus the Chola empire was completely overshadowed by the Pandyan empire and sank into obscurity by the end of the 13th century and until period of the Vijayanagara empire. In the early 16th century, Virasekhara Chola, king of Tanjore rose out of obscurity and plundered the dominions of the then Pandya prince in south. The Pandya who was under the protection of the Vijayanagara appealed to the emperor and the Raya accordingly directed his agent (Karyakartta) Nagama Nayaka who was stationed in the south to put down the Chola. Nagama Nayaka then defeated the Chola but to everyone's surprise the once loyal officer of Krishnadeva Raya defied the emperor for some reason and decided to keep Madurai for himself. Krishnadeva Raya is then said to have dispatched Nagama's son, Viswanatha who defeated his father and restored Madurai to Vijayanagara. The fate of Virasekhara Chola, the last of the line of Cholas is not known. It is speculated that he either fell in battle or was put to death along with his heirs during his encounter with Vijayanagara.

Administration and society

Chola territory

According to Tamil tradition, the Chola country comprised the region that includes the modern-day Tiruchirapalli District, Tiruvarur District, Nagapattinam District, Ariyalur District, Perambalur district, Pudukkottai district, Thanjavur District in Tamil Nadu and Karaikal District. The river Kaveri and its tributaries dominate this landscape of generally flat country that gradually slopes towards the sea, unbroken by major hills or valleys. The river, which is also known as the Ponni (Golden) river, had a special place in the culture of Cholas. The annual floods in the Kaveri marked an occasion for celebration, known as Adiperukku, in which the whole nation took part.

Kaveripoompattinam on the coast near the Kaveri delta was a major port town. Ptolemy knew of this, which he called Khaberis, and the other port town of Nagappattinam as the most important centres of Cholas. These two towns became hubs of trade and commerce and attracted many religious faiths, including Buddhism. Roman ships found their way into these ports. Roman coins dating from the early centuries of the common era have been found near the Kaveri delta.

The other major towns were Thanjavur, Uraiyur and Kudanthai, now known as Kumbakonam. After Rajendra Chola moved his capital to Gangaikonda Cholapuram, Thanjavur lost its importance.

Government

In the age of the Cholas, the whole of South India was for the first time brought under a single government.

The Cholas' system of government was monarchical, as in the Sangam age. However, there was little in common between the local chiefdoms of the earlier period and the imperial-like states of Rajaraja Chola and his successors. Aside from the early capital at Thanjavur and the later on at Gangaikonda Cholapuram, Kanchipuram and Madurai were considered to be regional capitals in which occasional courts were held. The king was the supreme leader and a benevolent authoritarian. His administrative role consisted of issuing oral commands to responsible officers when representations were made to him. Due to the lack of a legislature or a legislative system in the modern sense, the fairness of king's orders dependent on his morality and belief in Dharma. The Chola kings built temples and endowed them with great wealth. The temples acted not only as places of worship but also as centres of economic activity, benefiting the community as a whole. Some of the output of villages throughout the kingdom was given to temples that reinvested some of the wealth accumulated as loans to the settlements. According to Kathleen Gough, during the Chola period the Vellalar were the "dominant secular aristocratic caste ... providing the courtiers, most of the army officers, the lower ranks of the kingdom's bureaucracy, and the upper layer of the peasantry".

Before the reign of Rajaraja Chola I huge parts of the Chola territory were ruled by hereditary lords and local princes who were in a loose alliance with the Chola rulers. Thereafter, until the reign of Vikrama Chola in 1133 CE when the Chola power was at its peak, these hereditary lords and local princes virtually vanished from the Chola records and were either replaced or turned into dependent officials. Through these dependent officials the administration was improved and the Chola kings were able to exercise a closer control over the different parts of the empire. There was an expansion of the administrative structure, particularly from the reign of Rajaraja Chola I onwards. The government at this time had a large land revenue department, consisting of several tiers, which was largely concerned with maintaining accounts. The assessment and collection of revenue were undertaken by corporate bodies such as the ur, nadu, sabha, nagaram and sometimes by local chieftains who passed the revenue to the centre.

The order of the King was first communicated by the executive officer to the local authorities. Afterwards the records of the transaction was drawn up and attested by a number of witnesses who were either local magnates or government officers.

At local government level, every village was a self-governing unit. These structures underwent constant change and refinement throughout the Chola period.

Justice was mostly a local matter in the Chola Empire; minor disputes were settled at the village level. Punishment for minor crimes were in the form of fines or a direction for the offender to donate to some charitable endowment. Even crimes such as manslaughter or murder were punished with fines. Crimes of the state, such as treason, were heard and decided by the king himself; the typical punishment in these cases was either execution or confiscation of property.

Military
The Chola dynasty had a robust military, of which the king was the supreme commander. It had four elements, comprising the cavalry, the elephant corps, several divisions of infantry and a navy. There were regiments of bowmen and swordsmen while the swordsmen were the most permanent and dependable troops. The Chola army was spread all over the country and was stationed in local garrisons or military camps known as Kodagams. The elephants played a major role in the army and the dynasty had numerous war elephants. These carried houses or huge Howdahs on their backs, full of soldiers who shot arrows at long range and who fought with spears at close quarters.

The Chola rulers built several palaces and fortifications to protect their cities. The fortifications were mostly made up of bricks but other materials like stone, wood and mud were also used. According to the ancient Tamil text Silappadikaram, the Tamil kings defended their forts with catapults that threw stones, huge cauldrons of boiling water or molten lead, and hooks, chains and traps.

The soldiers of the Chola dynasty used weapons such as swords, bows, javelins, spears and shields which were made up of steel. Particularly the famous Wootz steel, which has a long history in south India dating back to the period before the Christian era, seems also be used to produce weapons. Kallar served in the armies of the Chola kings.

The Chola navy was the zenith of ancient India sea power. It played a vital role in the expansion of the empire, including the conquest of the Ceylon islands and naval raids on Srivijaya. The navy grew both in size and status during the medieval Cholas reign. The Chola admirals commanded much respect and prestige. The navy commanders also acted as diplomats in some instances. From 900 to 1100, the navy had grown from a small backwater entity to that of a potent power projection and diplomatic symbol in all of Asia, but was gradually reduced in significance when the Cholas fought land battles subjugating the Chalukyas of the Andhra-Kannada area in South India.

A martial art called Silambam was patronised by the Chola rulers. Ancient and medieval Tamil texts mention different forms of martial traditions but the ultimate expression of the loyalty of the warrior to his commander was a form of martial suicide called Navakandam. The medieval Kalingathu Parani text, which celebrates the victory of Kulothunga Chola I and his general in the battle for Kalinga, describes the practice in detail.

Economy
Land revenue and trade tax were the main source of income.
The Chola rulers issued their coins in gold, silver and copper. The Chola economy was based on three tiers—at the local level, agricultural settlements formed the foundation to commercial towns nagaram, which acted as redistribution centres for externally produced items bound for consumption in the local economy and as sources of products made by nagaram artisans for the international trade. At the top of this economic pyramid were the elite merchant groups (samayam) who organised and dominated the regions international maritime trade.

One of the main articles which were exported to foreign countries were cotton cloth. Uraiyur, the capital of the early Chola rulers, was a famous centre for cotton textiles which were praised by Tamil poets. The Chola rulers actively encouraged the weaving industry and derived revenue from it. During this period the weavers started to organise themselves into guilds. The weavers had their own residential sector in all towns. The most important weaving communities in early medieval times were the Saliyar and Kaikolar. During the Chola period silk weaving attained a high degree and Kanchipuram became one of the main centres for silk.

Metal crafts reached its zenith during the 10th to 11th centuries because the Chola rulers like Chembian Maadevi extended their patronage to metal craftsmen. Wootz steel was a major export item.

The farmers occupied one of the highest positions in society. These were the Vellalar community who formed the nobility or the landed aristocracy of the country and who were economically a powerful group. Agriculture was the principal occupation for many people. Besides the landowners, there were others dependent on agriculture. The Vellalar community was the dominant secular aristocratic caste under the Chola rulers, providing the courtiers, most of the army officers, the lower ranks of the bureaucracy and the upper layer of the peasantry.

In almost all villages the distinction between persons paying the land-tax (iraikudigal) and those who did not was clearly established. There was a class of hired day-labourers who assisted in agricultural operations on the estates of other people and received a daily wage. All cultivable land was held in one of the three broad classes of tenure which can be distinguished as peasant proprietorship called vellan-vagai, service tenure and eleemosynary tenure resulting from charitable gifts. The vellan-vagai was the ordinary ryotwari village of modern times, having direct relations with the government and paying a land-tax liable to revision from time to time. The vellan-vagai villages fell into two broad classes- one directly remitting a variable annual revenue to the state and the other paying dues of a more or less fixed character to the public
institutions like temples to which they were assigned. The prosperity of an agricultural country depends to a large extent on the facilities provided for irrigation. Apart from sinking wells and excavating tanks, the Chola rulers threw mighty stone dams across the Kaveri and other rivers, and cut out channels to distribute water over large tracts of land. Rajendra Chola I dug near his capital an artificial lake, which was filled with water from the Kolerun and the Vellar rivers.

There existed a brisk internal trade in several articles carried on by the organised mercantile corporations in various parts of the country. The metal industries and the jewellers art had reached a high degree of excellence. The manufacture of sea-salt was carried on under government supervision and control. Trade was carried on by merchants organised in guilds. The guilds described sometimes by the terms nanadesis were a powerful autonomous corporation of merchants which visited different countries in the course of their trade. They had their own mercenary army for the protection of their merchandise. There were also local organisations of merchants called "nagaram" in big centres of trade like Kanchipuram and Mamallapuram.

Hospitals
Hospitals were maintained by the Chola kings, whose government gave lands for that purpose. The Tirumukkudal inscription shows that a hospital was named after Vira Chola. Many diseases were cured by the doctors of the hospital, which was under the control of a chief physician who was paid annually 80 Kalams of paddy, 8 Kasus and a grant of land. Apart from the doctors, other remunerated staff included a nurse, barber (who performed minor operations) and a waterman.

The Chola queen Kundavai also established a hospital at Tanjavur and gave land for the perpetual maintenance of it.

Society
During the Chola period several guilds, communities and castes emerged. The guild was one of the most significant institutions of south India and merchants organised themselves into guilds. The best known of these were the Manigramam and Ayyavole guilds though other guilds such as Anjuvannam and Valanjiyar were also in existence. The farmers occupied one of the highest positions in society. These were the Vellalar community who formed the nobility or the landed aristocracy of the country and who were economically a powerful group. The Vellalar community was the dominant secular aristocratic caste under the Chola rulers, providing the courtiers, most of the army officers, the lower ranks of the bureaucracy and the upper layer of the peasantry. The Vellalar were also sent to northern Sri Lanka by the Chola rulers as settlers. The Ulavar community were working in the field which was associated with agriculture and the peasants were known as Kalamar.

The Kaikolar community were weavers and merchants but they also maintained armies. During the Chola period they had predominant trading and military roles. During the reign of the Imperial Chola rulers (10th–13th century) there were major changes in the temple administration and land ownership. There was more involvement of non-Brahmin elements in the temple administration. This can be attributed to the shift in money power. Skilled classes like the weavers and the merchant-class had become prosperous. Land ownership was no longer a privilege of the Brahmins (priest caste) and the Vellalar land owners.

There is little information on the size and the density of the population during the Chola reign The stability in the core Chola region enabled the people to lead a productive and contented life. However, there were reports of widespread famine caused by natural calamities.

The quality of the inscriptions of the regime indicates a high level of literacy and education. The text in these inscriptions was written by court poets and engraved by talented artisans. Education in the contemporary sense was not considered important; there is circumstantial evidence to suggest that some village councils organised schools to teach the basics of reading and writing to children, although there is no evidence of systematic educational system for the masses. Vocational education was through hereditary training in which the father passed on his skills to his sons. Tamil was the medium of education for the masses; Religious monasteries (matha or gatika) were centres of learning and received government support.

Foreign trade

The Cholas excelled in foreign trade and maritime activity, extending their influence overseas to China and Southeast Asia. Towards the end of the 9th century, southern India had developed extensive maritime and commercial activity. The south Indian guilds played a major role in interregional and overseas trade. The best known of these were the Manigramam and Ayyavole guilds who followed the conquering Chola armies. The encouragement by the Chola court furthered the expansion of Tamil merchant associations such as the Ayyavole and Manigramam guilds into Southeast Asia and China. The Cholas, being in possession of parts of both the west and the east coasts of peninsular India, were at the forefront of these ventures. The Tang dynasty of China, the Srivijaya empire under the Sailendras, and the Abbasid Kalifat at Baghdad were the main trading partners.

Some credit for the emergence of a world market must also go to the dynasty. It played a significant role in linking the markets of China to the rest of the world. The market structure and economic policies of the Chola dynasty were more conducive to a large-scale, cross-regional market trade than those enacted by the Chinese Song Dynasty. A Chola record gives their rationale for engagement in foreign trade: "Make the merchants of distant foreign countries who import elephants and good horses attach to yourself by providing them with villages and decent dwellings in the city, by affording them daily audience, presents and allowing them profits. Then those articles will never go to your enemies."

Song dynasty reports record that an embassy from Chulian (Chola) reached the Chinese court in 1077, and that the king of the Chulian at the time, Kulothunga I, was called Ti-hua-kia-lo. This embassy was a trading venture and was highly profitable to the visitors, who returned with copper coins in exchange for articles of tribute, including glass and spices. Probably, the motive behind Rajendra's expedition to Srivijaya was the protection of the merchants' interests.

Canals and water tanks
There was tremendous agrarian expansion during the rule of the imperial Chola dynasty (c. 900–1270 AD) all over Tamil Nadu and particularly in the Kaveri Basin. Most of the canals of the Kaveri River belongs to this period e.g. Uyyakondan canal, Rajendran vaykkal, Sembian Mahadegvi vaykkal. There was a well-developed and highly efficient system of water management from the village level upwards. Committees like eri-variyam (tank-committee) and totta-variam (garden committees) were active as also the temples with their vast resources in land, men and money. The water tanks that came up during the Chola period are too many to be listed here. But a few most outstanding may be briefly mentioned. Rajendra Chola built a huge tank named Solagangam in his capital city Gangaikonda Solapuram and was described as the liquid pillar of victory. About 16 miles long, it was provided with sluices and canals for irrigating the lands in the neighbouring areas. Another very large lake of this period, which even today seems an important source of irrigation was the Viranameri near Kattumannarkoil in South Arcot district founded by Parantaka Chola. Other famous lakes of this period are Madurantakam, Sundra-cholapereri, Kundavai-Pereri (after a Chola queen).

Cultural contributions

Under the Cholas, the Tamil country reached new heights of excellence in art, religion, music and literature. In all of these spheres, the Chola period marked the culmination of movements that had begun in an earlier age under the Pallavas. Monumental architecture in the form of majestic temples and sculpture in stone and bronze reached a finesse never before achieved in India.

The Chola conquest of Kadaram (Kedah) and Srivijaya, and their continued commercial contacts with the Chinese Empire, enabled them to influence the local cultures. Examples of the Hindu cultural influence found today throughout Southeast Asia owe much to the legacy of the Cholas. For example, the great temple complex at Prambanan in Indonesia exhibit a number of similarities with the South Indian architecture.

According to the Malay chronicle Sejarah Melayu, the rulers of the Malacca sultanate claimed to be descendants of the kings of the Chola Empire. Chola rule is remembered in Malaysia today as many princes there have names ending with Cholan or Chulan, one such being Raja Chulan, the Raja of Perak.

Art and architecture 

The Cholas continued the temple-building traditions of the Pallava dynasty and contributed significantly to the Dravidian temple design. They built a number of Shiva temples along the banks of the river Kaveri. The template for these and future temples was formulated by Aditya I and Parantaka. The Chola temple architecture has been appreciated for its magnificence as well as delicate workmanship, ostensibly following the rich traditions of the past bequeathed to them by the Pallava Dynasty. Architectural historian James Fergusson says that "the Chola artists conceived like giants and finished like jewelers". A new development in Chola art that characterised the Dravidian architecture in later times was the addition of a huge gateway called gopuram to the enclosure of the temple, which had gradually taken its form and attained maturity under the Pandya Dynasty. The Chola school of art also spread to Southeast Asia and influenced the architecture and art of Southeast Asia.

Temple building received great impetus from the conquests and the genius of Rajaraja Chola and his son Rajendra Chola I. The maturity and grandeur to which the Chola architecture had evolved found expression in the two temples of Thanjavur and Gangaikondacholapuram. The magnificent Shiva temple of Thanjavur, completed around 1009, is a fitting memorial to the material achievements of the time of Rajaraja. The largest and tallest of all Indian temples of its time, it is at the apex of South Indian architecture. The temple of Gangaikondacholisvaram at Gangaikondacholapuram, the creation of Rajendra Chola, was intended to excel its predecessor. Completed around 1030, only two decades after the temple at Thanjavur and in the same style, the greater elaboration in its appearance attests the more affluent state of the Chola Empire under Rajendra. The Brihadisvara Temple, the temple of Gangaikondacholisvaram and the Airavatesvara Temple at Darasuram were declared as World Heritage Sites by the UNESCO and are referred to as the Great living Chola temples.

The Chola period is also remarkable for its sculptures and bronzes. Among the existing specimens in museums around the world and in the temples of South India may be seen many fine figures of Shiva in various forms, such as Vishnu and his consort Lakshmi, and the Shaivite saints. Though conforming generally to the iconographic conventions established by long tradition, the sculptors worked with great freedom in the 11th and the 12th centuries to achieve a classic grace and grandeur. The best example of this can be seen in the form of Nataraja the Divine Dancer.

Literature

The Imperial Chola era was the golden age of Tamil culture, marked by the importance of literature. Chola records cite many works, including the Rajarajesvara Natakam, Viranukkaviyam and Kannivana Puranam.

The revival of Hinduism from its nadir during the Kalabhras spurred the construction of numerous temples and these in turn generated Shaiva and Vaishnava devotional literature. Jain and Buddhist authors flourished as well, although in fewer numbers than in previous centuries. Jivaka-chintamani by Tirutakkatevar and Sulamani by Tolamoli are among notable works by non-Hindu authors. The grammarian Buddhamitra wrote a text on Tamil grammar called Virasoliyam. Commentaries were written on the great text Tolkāppiyam which deals with grammar but which also mentions ethics of warfare. Periapuranam was another remarkable literary piece of this period. This work is in a sense a national epic of the Tamil people because it treats of the lives of the saints who lived in all parts of Tamil Nadu and belonged to all classes of society, men and women, high and low, educated and uneducated.

Kamban flourished during the reign of Kulothunga III. His Ramavataram (also referred to as Kambaramayanam) is an epic of Tamil literature, and although the author states that he followed Valmiki's Ramayana, it is generally accepted that his work is not a simple translation or adaptation of the Sanskrit epic. He imports into his narration the colour and landscape of his own time; his description of Kosala is an idealised account of the features of the Chola country.

Jayamkondar's masterpiece, Kalingattuparani, is an example of narrative poetry that draws a clear boundary between history and fictitious conventions. This describes the events during Kulothunga's war in Kalinga and depicts not only the pomp and circumstance of war, but the gruesome details of the field. The Tamil poet Ottakuttan was a contemporary of Kulothunga I and served at the courts of three of Kulothunga's successors. Ottakuttan wrote Kulothunga Cholan Ula, a poem extolling the virtues of the Chola king.

Nannul is a Chola era work on Tamil grammar. It discusses all five branches of grammar and, according to Berthold Spuler, is still relevant today and is one of the most distinguished normative grammars of literary Tamil.

The Telugu Choda period was in particular significant for the development of Telugu literature under the patronage of the rulers. It was the age in which the great Telugu poets Tikkana, Ketana, Marana and Somana enriched the literature with their contributions. Tikkana Somayaji wrote Nirvachanottara Ramayanamu and Andhra Mahabharatamu. Abhinava Dandi Ketana wrote Dasakumaracharitramu, Vijnaneswaramu and Andhra Bhashabhushanamu. Marana wrote Markandeya Purana in Telugu. Somana wrote Basava Purana. Tikkana is one of the kavitrayam who translated Mahabharata into Telugu language.

Of the devotional literature, the arrangement of the Shaivite canon into eleven books was the work of Nambi Andar Nambi, who lived close to the end of the 10th century. However, relatively few Vaishnavite works were composed during the Later Chola period, possibly because of the rulers' apparent animosity towards them.

Cultural centres
Chola rulers took an active interest in the development of temple centres and used the temples to widen the sphere of their royal authority. They established educational institutions and hospitals around the temple, enhanced the beneficial aspects of the role of the temple, and projected the royalty as a very powerful and genial presence. A record of Virarajendra Chola's reign relates to the maintenance of a school in the Jananamandapa within the temple for the study of the Vedas, Sastras, Grammar, and Rupavatara, as well as a hostel for students. The students were provided with food, bathing oil on Saturdays, and oil for pups. A hospital named Virasolan was provided with fifteen beds for sick people. The items of expense set apart for their comforts are rice, a doctor, a surgeon, two maid servants for nursing the patients, and a general servant for the hospital.

Religion

In general, Cholas were followers of Hinduism. They were not swayed by the rise of Buddhism and Jainism as were the kings of the Pallava and Pandya dynasties. Kocengannan, an Early Chola, was celebrated in both Sangam literature and in the Shaivite canon as a Hindu saint.

While the Cholas did build their largest and most important temple dedicated to Shiva, it can be by no means concluded that either they were followers of Shaivism only or that they were not favourably disposed to other faiths. This is borne out by the fact that the second Chola king, Aditya I (871–903 CE), built temples for Shiva and also for Vishnu. Inscriptions of 890 refer to his contributions to the construction of the Ranganatha Temple at Srirangapatnam in the country of the Western Gangas, who were both his feudatories and had connections by marriage with him. He also pronounced that the great temples of Shiva and the Ranganatha temple were to be the Kuladhanam of the Chola emperors.

Parantaka II was a devotee of the reclining Vishnu (Vadivu Azhagiya Nambi) at Anbil, on the banks of the Kaveri river on the outskirts of Tiruchy, to whom he gave numerous gifts and embellishments. He also prayed before him before his embarking on war to regain the territories in and around Kanchi and Arcot from the waning Rashtrakutas and while leading expeditions against both Madurai and Ilam (Sri Lanka). Parantaka I and Parantaka Chola II endowed and built temples for Shiva and Vishnu. Rajaraja Chola I patronised Buddhists and provided for the construction of the Chudamani Vihara, a Buddhist monastery in Nagapattinam, at the request of Sri Chulamanivarman, the Srivijaya Sailendra king.

During the period of the Later Cholas, there are alleged to have been instances of intolerance towards Vaishnavites especially towards their acharya, Ramanuja. A Chola sovereign called Krimikanta Chola is said to have persecuted Ramanuja. Some scholars identify Kulothunga Chola II with Krimikanta Chola or worm-necked Chola, so called as he is said to have suffered from cancer of the throat or neck. The latter finds mention in the vaishnava Guruparampara and is said to have been a strong opponent of the vaishnavas. The work Parpannamritam (17th century) refers to the Chola king called Krimikanta who is said to have removed the Govindaraja idol from the Chidambaram Nataraja temple. However, according to "Koil Olugu" (temple records) of the Srirangam temple, Kulottunga Chola II was the son of Krimikanta Chola. The former, unlike his father, is said to have been a repentant son who supported vaishnavism. Ramanuja is said to have made Kulottunga II as a disciple of his nephew, Dasarathi. The king then granted the management of the Ranganathaswamy temple to Dasarathi and his descendants as per the wish of Ramanuja. Historian Nilakanta Sastri identifies Krimikanta Chola with Adhirajendra Chola or Virarajendra Chola with whom the main line (Vijayalaya line) ended. There is an inscription from 1160 AD which states that the custodians of Shiva temples who had social intercourses with Vaishnavites would forfeit their property. However, this is more of a direction to the Shaivite community by its religious heads than any kind of dictat by a Chola emperor. While Chola kings built their largest temples for Shiva and even while emperors like Rajaraja Chola I held titles like Sivapadasekharan, in none of their inscriptions did the Chola emperors proclaim that their clan only and solely followed Shaivism or that Shaivism was the state religion during their rule.

List of Rulers

In popular culture

The Chola dynasty has inspired many Tamil authors. The most important work of this genre is the popular Ponniyin Selvan (The son of Ponni), a historical novel in Tamil written by Kalki Krishnamurthy. Written in five volumes, this narrates the story of Rajaraja Chola, dealing with the events leading up to the ascension of Uttama Chola to the Chola throne. Kalki had used the confusion in the succession to the Chola throne after the demise of Parantaka Chola II. The book was serialised in the Tamil periodical Kalki during the mid-1950s. The serialisation lasted for nearly five years and every week its publication was awaited with great interest.

Kalki's earlier historical romance, Parthiban Kanavu, deals with the fortunes of the imaginary Chola prince Vikraman, who was supposed to have lived as a feudatory of the Pallava king Narasimhavarman I during the 7th century. The period of the story lies within the interregnum during which the Cholas were in decline before Vijayalaya Chola revived their fortunes. Parthiban Kanavu was also serialised in the Kalki weekly during the early 1950s.

Sandilyan, another popular Tamil novelist, wrote Kadal Pura in the 1960s. It was serialised in the Tamil weekly Kumudam. Kadal Pura is set during the period when Kulothunga Chola I was in exile from the Vengi kingdom after he was denied the throne. It speculates the whereabouts of Kulothunga during this period. Sandilyan's earlier work, Yavana Rani, written in the early 1960s, is based on the life of Karikala Chola. More recently, Balakumaran wrote the novel Udaiyar, which is based on the circumstances surrounding Rajaraja Chola's construction of the Brihadisvara Temple in Thanjavur.

There were stage productions based on the life of Rajaraja Chola during the 1950s and in 1973 Sivaji Ganesan acted in a screen adaptation of a play titled Rajaraja Cholan. The Cholas are featured in the History of the World board game, produced by Avalon Hill.

The Cholas were the subject of the 2010 Tamil-language film Aayirathil Oruvan, and the 2022 film Ponniyin Selvan: I. The 2022 movie was based on the novel of the same name.

See also
 History of Tamil Nadu
 Karungalakudi
 List of Tamil monarchs
 Tamil inscriptions in Malaysia
 Mutharaiyar dynasty

References

Notes

Citations

General sources

External links

 UNESCO World Heritage sites – Chola temples
 Art of Cholas
 Chola coins of Sri Lanka

 

1279 disestablishments in Asia
1st-millennium BC establishments in India
Coromandel Coast
Dynasties of India
Empires and kingdoms of India
Hindu dynasties
History of Thanjavur
States and territories disestablished in 1279
States and territories established in the 4th century BC
Tamil monarchs
Solar dynasty